The Mark 90 nuclear bomb, given the nickname "Betty", was a cold war nuclear depth charge, developed by the United States in 1952.

Its purpose was to serve as an anti-submarine weapon for the United States Navy.

A test of the Mark 90 was conducted in 1955, as Operation Wigwam.

All units were withdrawn from service by 1960.

Accident

A Mark 90 depth charge casing was lost and never recovered, but it was not fitted with an active warhead. The ten crew members were rescued by the US Coast Guard, after ten hours in a raft. The press was not notified at the time.

See also
 List of accidents and incidents involving military aircraft (1955–1959)

References

External links
Official Defense Department film on 1955 underwater test of Mark 90 nuclear depth charge

Cold War anti-submarine weapons of the United States
Depth charges
Nuclear bombs of the United States